is a Japanese manga written and illustrated by Jin Kobayashi. The manga was serialized in Square Enix's Gangan Wing shōnen manga magazine from August 2006 to September 2010, with its chapters collected in eight bound volumes. Natsu no Arashi! was also adapted into two anime television series by Shaft under the direction of Akiyuki Shinbo, Shin Oonuma, and Kenichi Ishikura and broadcast in Japan from April 5, 2009 to December 27, 2009. Maiden Japan licensed the series for US release on November 12, 2019 on Blu-ray.

Plot
Thirteen-year-old Yasaka is a boy staying at his grandfather's house during his summer vacation. One day he entered a store and met Arashi, a beautiful sixteen-year-old girl working there. After trying to protect her from a man who claims to have been hired by her family to take her back by force, Yasaka ran away with her and now she stays at his grandpa's place with him. It didn't take much time for Yasaka to figure out that his new friend is far from an ordinary girl, as she possesses mysterious powers. The plot thickens when he finds a sixty-year-old picture of Arashi and another girl named Kaja, and to the surprise of all Kaja suddenly appears, and just like Arashi, her appearance hasn't changed at all since then.

Two other characters introduced so far are the place's owner, a woman whose name is still unrevealed and rumored to be a high level con artist, and Jun Kamigamo, a student of Yasaka's age whom he met at the store, and works there with him since then. Despite being a girl, she keeps dressing and addressing herself as a boy to the other characters. So far only Kaja and Arashi know her secret.

Characters

The main male protagonist. A 13-year-old boy who is spending his summer vacation in his grandfather's house. When he met Arashi from the first time, he established a connection with her when he touched her hand, and since then the duo gained the power to travel back and forth in time. He is infatuated with Arashi's beauty and kindness, but is afraid to convey his feelings to her. He is a friend of Jun.

The main female protagonist. Despite still looking like a beautiful sixteen-year-old girl, Arashi is in fact a ghost who lived during World War II times. Since then her mission had been traveling back in time to rescue those in her community from air raids by American warplanes. However, to travel back to the past, she must do it accompanied by a living person from the present with whom she made a "connection". Her relationship with Hajime is a bit more complicated than it seems.
In the second season it is revealed that Arashi's first love was a time-tripping Hajime.

Another ghost from Arashi's time and her best friend. She was an exchange student from Germany who studied at her school. Her polite and cool demeanor opposes to Arashi's lively and carefree personality. She possesses the same time travelling powers as her, but she can only make a connection with a living girl due to her shyness around boys. 
Her favorite dessert is ice cream.

She is Hajime's friend that has made a connection with Kaja and jumps through time with her. Hajime misunderstands that she is a guy. In the second season Jun starts to have feeling for Hajime.
In the first season Her secret was revealed in episode 5.
She used to have long hair which showed in the anime and she has great acting skills.

A con artist who owns (more like uses, the cafe is abandoned in the manga) the cafe in which Hajime, Arashi and the other girls work. She seems to have a crush on Yamashiro. Her grandfather was a foreign soldier, giving her the appearance of a westerner which became a source of grief throughout her past. She lost her family early, making her an orphan.

A private investigator. He is the son of a man Arashi saved from certain death by preventing him from fishing in the river, on a day when an air-raid struck the area. He loses his right eye when he defended his family from yakuza, for unknown reason. He became butler for Kanako and Yayoi and energy-source for Kanako after their conflict with Arashi and co. solved.

Just like her friend Kanako, she is another ghost who died during the war and an acquaintance of Arashi and Kaja, her ethereal body has been weakening through time. Due to a horrifying accident, she's half-paralyzed and can't walk without wheelchair. Her paralysis is more to psychological condition. However, she was healed when she went back to the past and met Kanako again for the first time. Her personality is the polar opposite of Kanako, especially her naiveness that worries Kanako greatly.
In the second season she connects with both Hajime and Yamashiro's dog Josephine and Sayaka.

Just like Yayoi, her ethereal body weakened and she resorted to steal Arashi's energy to replace her and her friend's, until she figured out that only by making a connection with a living human, her energy would be restored. She and Yayoi are best friends and spent their ghost-living in a run-down mansion. She is very protective and deeply cared of Yayoi's well-being, up to the point where she does not hesitant to hurt somebody for her sake. She is "connected" with Hideo. She looked tough, rude, and unlikeable at first. This is because she had gone through a lot of hardships since childhood and loathes rich girls such as Kaja, Arashi, and Yayoi. Her encounter with Yayoi changed her perspective and she became able to open up herself.

A young man who Arashi saved when he was a child and Hajime's main target of jealousy, as he is always in good terms with her. He is handsome, smart, nice, godd-natured, and comes from wealthy family, which makes "Perfect Man" and this fact nerves Hajime. Former Teen Rebel, until Yayoi met him in time travel 10 years' prior the series.

A regular at the cafe who always asks for salt, but never gets it till the end of the second season.

Jun's modeling friend. She pretends to be Jun's girlfriend to get a laugh, and then pretends that Jun is cheating on her as to amuse herself even further.

Jun's older sister. She is a model too.

She's a manga artist who, on her first visit to Seven, tries to kiss Yayoi and Arashi. It's revealed that she's actually looking for models and has to 'experience' the scene in order to draw it correctly.

Anime
In November 2008, an anime adaption of Natsu no Arashi! was announced. The anime series was produced by Shaft, directed by Akiyuki Shinbo and Shin Oonuma, with Katsuhiko Takayama acting as series composition writer and Kazuhiro Oota (Shaft) designing the characters for animation. Oota and Yoshiaki Itou (Shaft) served as chief animation directors, and Ken Sato composed the music. The series was broadcast from April 5, 2009, it had a total of 13 episodes. Of its 12 episodes, 6 were produced in-house at Shaft, while 7 were outsourced: episodes 3, 5, 9, and 11–13 to Studio Pastoral; and episode 10 to Mushi Production.

Four pieces of theme music are used during the first season—one opening theme, one closing theme and two special closing themes for episodes six and eleven.

A second season, called  was announced in June 2009. Most of the main staff returned, including director Shinbo, series composition writer Takayama, character designer and chief animation director Oota, and music composer Sato. Itou did not return as Oota's co-chief animation director, and Oonuma acted as series director for only the first seven episodes. Kenichi Ishikura replaced Oonuma for the final six episodes. Only episode 8 was produced in-house at Shaft, while the rest were outsourced: episodes 1, 3, 6–7, 10–11, and 13 to Studio Pastoral; episode 2 to Studio Pastoral and Anime R; episode 4 to Studio Pastoral and Mushi Production; episode 9 to Mushi Production; and episodes 5 and 12 to Studio Izena.

Two pieces of theme music were used during its broadcast.

Both seasons were simulcasted to English language audiences by the video streaming website Crunchyroll.

Season one episode list

Season two episode list

Notes

References

External links
Manga official website 
Anime official website 

TV Tokyo website 

2006 manga
Anime series
Gangan Comics manga
Maiden Japan
Romantic comedy anime and manga
Shaft (company)
Shōnen manga
Supernatural anime and manga